Ron Leshem (born December 20, 1976), is an Israeli-American television writer and producer, best known for serving as executive producer on HBO's Euphoria, and for the film Beaufort, which was nominated for the Academy Award for Best Foreign Language Film. He co-created and wrote the television series No Man's Land (Hulu), Valley of Tears, Euphoria, The Gordin Cell, and the film Incitement, in addition to his career as a television executive. He is also a bestselling author, translated to 20 languages.

As a novelist, he has won some of the top Israeli literary awards, among them the prestigious annual Sapir Prize for Literature in 2006.

Early life and education 
Ron Leshem was born December 20, 1976, in Tel Aviv, Israel, to a Jewish family. His parents are Ziva and Gideon Leshem.

News career 
Leshem served as a soldier in the Intelligence Corps of the Israel Defense Forces. Subsequently, he spent three years as an Israeli reporter from the West Bank and the Gaza Strip, later on he was promoted as head of the news division at the most widely circulated newspaper in Israel Yediot Ahronot, for which he also wrote as an analyst for military affairs. By the age of 26, he started serving as deputy chief editor for Ma'ariv, one of the three major newspapers in Israel. He was the paper's youngest ever deputy editor. Additionally, he wrote short stories for Le Monde newspaper (France) as well as various columns in several European newspapers.

Leshem is often invited as a speaker to universities, including: Harvard, Yale, BU, and Berkeley. Leshem has also taken part in more than 60 festivals and book fairs.

Career

Keshet and Beaufort 
In 2005 he left print media and began working in television. From 2006 until 2009, Leshem was head of content and programming for Keshet Broadcasting. He oversaw development and production for Israeli TV series such as Arab Labor, the A-word, Traffic Light, and Homeland, an adaptation of his show Prisoners of War.

As a novelist he won the prestigious annual literary award the Sapir Prize for Literature in 2006 for his debut novel Beaufort, which was published in 2006 in Hebrew. The story is written as the diary of a young army officers, when IDF soldiers were protecting Beaufort Castle in Southern Lebanon b. Beaufort was on the Israel bestseller list for 2 years, sold 120,000 copies in Israel, was distributed in 22 countries, and was translated into more than 20 languages. The film version of Beaufort, which Leshem co-wrote, was nominated for the Academy Award for Best Foreign Language Film, and won the Berlin International Film Festival Silver Bear for Best Director.

Leshem's second book The Underground Bazaar also reached the bestseller list and was translated into numerous languages.

Executive producing and co-writing 
Leshem created and co-wrote the drama series The Gordin Cell, which received 11 nominations for the Israeli Academy of Film and Television awards in 2011. The TV series was adapted by NBC as Allegiance. In 2014, he was commissioned to develop the script for Crater Lake.

Furthermore, Leshem co-created and co-wrote the series Euphoria, for Hot (2012). In 2018, he joined the American production of Euphoria as an executive producer. It was released on HBO.

He and Amit Cohen struck a long-term development deal with Red Arrow Studios International in 2018, preparing to create a new scripted drama label.

The Israeli film Incitement by Yaron Zilberman, which Leshem co-wrote, premiered at the 2019 Toronto Film Festival. The film received 10 nominations for the Israeli Academy of Film and Television awards. He served as a story editor for the series Beauty and the Baker. Alongside his long-time writing partner, Amit Cohen, Leshem co-wrote and co-created the Syrian Civil War drama No Man's Land, an American-French co-production, which Hulu and Arte ordered straight to series in spring 2019.

In the summer of 2019, production began on Israel's Valley of Tears, an 8-part mini-series set in the Yom Kippur War, which Leshem co-created with Cohen, Daniel Amsel, Yaron Zilberman, Gal Zaid, and Izhar Has-Lev. It was picked up by HBO in 2020 and released as the "biggest-budget TV drama series" in Israel.

In 2019, Leshem published in Israel his novel When we were beautiful, and announced it will be translated to English by Jessica Cohen.

In 2019, he signed with Anonymous Content along with his frequent co-writer Amit Cohen, with whom he'd recently worked on the Hulu series Fertile Crescent, about the Syrian Civil War starring James Purefoy. Leshem, Cohen, and Xabi Molia wrote the eight episodes of Fertile Crescent. In November 2020, he was again partnering with WestEnd Films and Cohen on a new TV thriller, along with the company Anton.

Personal life 
Leshem lives between Boston and Los Angeles.

Filmography

Television

Film

As development executive 
 Arab Labor (2007–2011)
 Ramzor (Traffic light) (2008–2013)
 Prisoners of War (2010–2012)
 the A-word (2010–2014)
 Polishuk (2010)

Accolades

References

External links 
 Ron Leshem bio note at Random House, Inc.
 Ron Leshem 
 

1976 births
Israeli Jews
Israeli journalists
Israeli novelists
Jewish journalists
Jewish novelists
Living people